Eunoe eura is a scale worm described from off Peru in the South Pacific Ocean at a depth of 550 m.

Description
Number of segments 35; elytra 15 pairs. Brownish with greenish cast and with lighter, yellowish parapodia. Anterior margin of prostomium rounded. Lateral antennae inserted ventrally (beneath prostomium and median antenna). Notochaetae thinner than neurochaetae. Bidentate neurochaetae absent.

References

Phyllodocida
Animals described in 1919